Monticello is a city in Union Township, White County, Indiana, United States. . The city is the county seat of White County. The population was 5,508 at the 2020 census. 

Monticello is known as a tourist destination in north-central Indiana and is home to the Indiana Beach amusement park on Lake Shafer, and Lake Freeman.

Geography
Monticello is located at  (40.746709, -86.765359).

Demographics

2010 census
At the 2010 census there were 5,378 people, 2,179 households, and 1,319 families living in the city. The racial makup of the city was 90.8% White or European American, 0.4% African American, 0.4% Native American, 0.8% Asian, 5.5% from other races, and 2.1% from two or more races. Hispanic or Latino of any race were 12.5%.

Of the 2,179 households 31.1% had children under the age of 18 living with them, 42.6% were married couples living together, 13.1% had a female householder with no husband present, 4.9% had a male householder with no wife present, and 39.5% were non-families. 34.6% of households were one person and 18.1% were one person aged 65 or older. The average household size was 2.33 and the average family size was 2.99.

The median age was 40.4 years. 24% of residents were under the age of 18; 8.1% were between the ages of 18 and 24; 23.1% were from 25 to 44; 23.6% were from 45 to 64; and 21.1% were 65 or older. The gender makeup of the city was 47.3% male and 52.7% female.

2000 census
At the 2000 census there were 5,723 people, 2,268 households, and 1,417 families living in the city. The racial makup of the city was 91.39% White, 0.28% African American, 0.31% Native American, 0.59% Asian, 0.07% Pacific Islander, 5.96% from other races, and 1.40% from two or more races. Hispanic or Latino of any race were 11.22%.

Of the 2,268 households 29.1% had children under the age of 18 living with them, 48.2% were married couples living together, 10.7% had a female householder with no husband present, and 37.5% were non-families. 32.2% of households were one person and 16.5% were one person aged 65 or older. The average household size was 2.40 and the average family size was 3.04.

The age distribution was 24.3% under the age of 18, 9.3% from 18 to 24, 26.4% from 25 to 44, 21.1% from 45 to 64, and 18.9% 65 or older. The median age was 38 years. For every 100 females, there were 91.0 males. For every 100 females age 18 and over, there were 83.5 males.

The median household income was $35,537 and the median family income  was $42,831. Males had a median income of $30,478 versus $19,511 for females. The per capita income for the city was $17,066. About 4.8% of families and 8.1% of the population were below the poverty line, including 8.3% of those under age 18 and 9.7% of those age 65 or over.

History
Monticello was laid out in 1834 as the county seat, with a post office established that year, and is still currently in operation. The city was named after President Thomas Jefferson's estate in Virginia.

Monticello, Indiana sustained serious damage by a tornado on April 3, 1974, part of the 1974 Super Outbreak that caused death and destruction across the midwest and south. The aftermath of this storm is recorded in the Herald Journal's book, Killer Tornado. The tornado was rated F4 on the Fujita scale. This storm killed eight people and was part of tornado family that killed 18, causing an estimated $100 million in damage. In the immediate aftermath of the storm, news outlets reported three hundred deaths across the United States and the creation of temporary morgues. The local paper said the aftermath was similar to a World War II bombing.

On September 2, 2005, Jordan Manufacturing burned down. The company manufactured outdoor furniture such as folding chairs, umbrellas, and seat cushions. Due to the materials used in making these products, four city blocks were contaminated with toxins. The blaze was large enough to require firefighters from seven surrounding communities to battle it and needed approximately "3000 gallons of water per minute for the first three hours of the blaze."  While such a fire might not be a big event for a larger city, it had a profound impact on Monticello, as Jordan Manufacturing was one of the few manufacturing plants left in the city after a recession in the 2000s.

The Monticello Carnegie Library, James Culbertson Reynolds House, and South Grade School Building are listed on the National Register of Historic Places.

Education 
Twin Lakes School Corporation is the school system in Monticello. The Schools are Eastlawn (elementary), Oaklawn (elementary), Meadowlawn (elementary), Roosevelt Middle School, and Twin Lakes High School.  Woodlawn Elementary School was previously part of the district until it was closed in 2013.

The High School was heavily damaged by the 1974 tornado and had to be rebuilt. Students resumed classes in local churches and then in portable units erected near the location of the high school until reconstruction could be completed.

The town has a lending library, the Monticello-Union Township Public Library.

Entertainment

The lakes and campgrounds are popular tourist destinations, but the most well-known was Indiana Beach, an amusement park on Lake Shafer.

The Madam Carroll, docked on Lake Freeman, offers scenic lake cruises with live entertainment.  Dinner cruises are also held on certain dates.
On February 18, 2020, it was announced that Apex Parks Group, the owners of Indiana Beach since acquiring it in 2015, would be closing the park and dismantling the rides.  Indiana Beach has a new owner, and is going to remain open.

Notable people
 DJ Ashba (born 1972), rock musician
 W. E. Biederwolf (1867-1939), Presbyterian evangelist; buried in Old Monticello Cemetery
 BJ Hollars(born 1984), an American author
 Gregory Wasson (born 1958), president and CEO of Walgreens

References

External links
 City of Monticello, Indiana website
 Monticello Chamber of Commerce
 The Herald Journal, Monticello's Newspaper

Cities in Indiana
Cities in White County, Indiana
County seats in Indiana